XXV is a compilation album by English singer Robbie Williams, released through Columbia Records on 9 September 2022. The album marks the 25th anniversary of Williams's solo career, and contains re-recorded and orchestrated versions of songs from his career, which were reworked by Jules Buckley, Guy Chambers and Steve Sidwell with the Metropole Orkest. The XXV version of "Angels" was released as the lead single, followed by the double single "Eternity/The Road to Mandalay" and the new song "Lost" as the third single. The deluxe edition of the album adds 10 tracks, including four more original songs—"Disco Symphony", "More Than This", "Home Thoughts from Abroad" and "The World and Her Mother". The album debuted at number one on the UK Albums Chart, with Williams breaking the record for most number-one albums among solo acts.

Background
On 7 June 2022, Williams announced that his next album XXV, would be released on 9 September 2022. It features new versions of his hit songs, plus new material. On the same day as this announcement, Williams released "Angels (XXV)", a reworked version of "Angels".

Singles
The first single taken from XXV was a reimagined version of his hit single "Angels" and was released on 7 June 2022. On 10 June 2022, "Angels (XXV)" reached number 92 on the UK Official Singles Sales Chart, rising to 74 a week later.

The second official single was "Lost (XXV)". It was released on 5 August 2022.

Commercial performance
XXV became Williams's fourteenth number-one album on the UK Albums Chart, surpassing Elvis Presley as the solo act with the most UK number-one albums. The album also topped the charts in Ireland, Scotland and Netherlands, while also reaching the top five in Australia, Austria, Belgium, Germany and Switzerland.

XXV Tour

Dates

Track listing
All tracks are subtitled "XXV".

Charts

Weekly charts

Year-end charts

Certifications

References

2022 albums
Columbia Records albums
Robbie Williams albums
2022 compilation albums